Hali Flickinger (born July 7, 1994) is an American professional swimmer who specializes in freestyle, butterfly, and individual medley events. She represents the Cali Condors of the International Swimming League.

Flickinger qualified for the 2016 Summer Olympics in the 200 meter butterfly and finished seventh in the finals. For the 2020 Summer Olympics, Flickinger qualified to compete in the 200 meter butterfly and 400 meter individual medley, and she won the bronze medal in both events.

Career

Early career
Flickinger grew up in Spring Grove, Pennsylvania, and swam for coach Michael Brooks at the York YMCA Aquatic Club. She graduated from Spring Grove Area High School, where she was a three-time Scholastic All-American. She was the national champion at the 2011 and 2012 YMCA Short Course national championships in the 200 yard butterfly, where she set a new event record both years. Internationally, she won silver in the 4 × 200 meter freestyle relay as a member of the prelim team and bronze in the 200 meter individual medley at the 2011 FINA Swimming World Cup meet in Moscow, Russia.

Collegiately, Flickinger helped the Georgia Bulldogs swimming and diving women's team win the NCAA Division I women's team title in 2013, 2014, and 2016. She graduated from the University of Georgia in 2017 with a degree in finance.

2016–2018

2016 Summer Olympics
At the 2016 Summer Olympics in Rio de Janeiro, Brazil, Flickinger placed seventh in the 200 meter butterfly.

2017 World Aquatics Championships

Flickinger swam at the 2017 World Aquatics Championships in Budapest, Hungary in July 2017. She competed in two events, winning a gold medal for her efforts as part of the 4 × 200 meter freestyle relay. She finished ninth in the semifinals of the 200 meter butterfly and did not advance to the final.

2018 Pan Pacific Championships

At the 2018 US National Championships held in July in Irvine, California, Flickinger broke the 37-year-old US Open record set by Mary T. Meagher in 1981 at 2:05.96 in the 200 meter butterfly with her time of 2:05.87 in the prelims heats of the event. In August 2018 at the 2018 Pan Pacific Swimming Championships held in Tokyo, Japan, Flickinger won the gold medal in the 200 meter butterfly with a time of 2:07.35.

2019

2019 World Aquatics Championships

At the 2019 World Aquatics Championships in Gwangju, South Korea in July 2019, Flickinger won the silver medal in the 200 meter butterfly. She swam a 2:06.95, finishing less than two tenths of a second behind Boglárka Kapás and less than one tenth of a second ahead of Katie Drabot. This was the first world championship medal Flickinger won in an individual event.

2019 International Swimming League
In 2019 Flickinger was a member of the inaugural International Swimming League representing the Cali Condors, who finished third place in the final match in Las Vegas, Nevada in December. Flickinger won several events for the Condors including her specialty, the 200 meter butterfly, at the final.

2021

2020 US Olympic Trials

On June 17, 2021, Flickinger won the 200 meter butterfly at the 2020 USA Swimming Olympic Trials, qualifying for the US Olympic Swimming Team. Her time in the final, a 2:05.85, was a new US Open record and Championship record. This was Flickinger's second consecutive Olympic Games making the US team. In addition to winning the 200 meter butterfly, she took second place with a time of 4:33.96 in the 400 meter individual medley on the first day of Olympic Trials, qualifying her for the Olympics in that event.

On day six of competition, Flickinger ranked 15th with a time of 2:12.02 in the morning prelims heats of the 200 meter backstroke and advanced to the semifinals. In the semifinals, she was eighth overall, swimming a 2:09.61 and advancing to the final on day seven. Flickinger decided not to swim in the 200 meter backstroke final.

2020 Summer Olympics

Flickinger was one of 17 entrants in the 200 meter butterfly at the 2020 Summer Olympics in Tokyo, Japan, which was the individual swimming event with the least number of entries at that year's Olympic Games. On July 24, 2021, Flickinger competed in the prelims of the 400 meter individual medley, finishing fifth overall with a time of 4:35.98, and advancing to the final. In the final the next morning, she finished third with a time of 4:34.90, winning the bronze medal in the event.

On day four of competition, Flickinger swam a 2:08.31 in the prelims of the 200 meter butterfly and qualified for the semifinals ranked second overall. The following day of competition, she lowered her time to 2:06.23 in the semifinals, ranked second for both semifinal heats, and advanced to the final. In the final on day six of competition, Flickinger won her second medal of the 2020 Olympic Games, a bronze medal in the 200 meter butterfly with a time of 2:05.65. She was the first swimmer from York County, Pennsylvania to win an Olympic medal since 1948, and she was also the first athlete from the county to win more than one Olympic medal during their career in over 80 years.

2021 International Swimming League
Flickinger was selected for the Cali Condors team as part of the 2021 International Swimming League. She opted not to participate in the regular season of competition and entered to swim in the playoffs, appearing on the team's playoff roster. For the playoffs, she and a few other Cali Condors members, including fellow Olympian Caeleb Dressel, did not participate in the first match.

Flickinger made her 2021 International Swimming League debut in the 200 meter backstroke in the fourth match of the playoffs, match fifteen overall, swimming a 2:04.90, placing fifth, and earning 4.0 points for her team. For the 200 meter individual medley, she finished eighth with a time of 2:11.90. In the 400 meter freestyle, Flickinger won her first event of the season with a time of 4:00.82, which was three-hundredths of a second faster than second-place finisher Freya Anderson of the London Roar. Flickinger achieved her second win of the match on the second and final day of competition, winning the 200 meter butterfly with a time of 2:04.62 and earning 10.0 points for her team. For her last event of the match, she swam a 4:31.75 in the 400 meter individual medley, scoring 13.0 points and placing second.

2022

Pro Swim Series – San Antonio
On March 31, at the Pro Swim Series in San Antonio, Texas, Flickinger swam a 1:59.08 in the prelims heats of the 200 meter freestyle to qualify for the final ranking second and a 4:50.14 in the 400 meter individual medley to qualify for the final ranking first. In the finals of the events, she won the 400 meter individual medley with a 4:40.62 and placed fourth in the 200 meter freestyle with a 1:58.90. The following morning, she advanced to the final of the 200 meter butterfly with a 2:11.15 and first-rank and the final of the 400 meter freestyle with a 4:13.71 and third-rank. She won the 200 meter butterfly final with a 2:08.47 and placed third in the 400 meter freestyle final in 4:10.38. She swam 2:13.81 in the prelims heats of the 200 meter backstroke on the fourth and final day, qualifying for the final ranking sixth. Lowering her time to a 2:11.23 in the final, she placed fourth to conclude her competition at the Northside Swim Center for the Pro Swim Series stop.

2022 International Team Trials
On the first day of the 2022 US International Team Trials in Greensboro, North Carolina, Flickinger ranked first in the preliminary heats of the 200 meter butterfly with a 2:07.75 and qualified for the evening final. She won the A final with a time of 2:06.35, qualifying for the world championships team. The second day, she qualified for the final of the 200 meter freestyle with a 1:58.31 in the morning prelims heats, ranking sixth overall. In the final, she placed fourth with a personal best time of 1:57.53, qualifying for the World Championships team in the 4×200 meter freestyle relay. Day three, she qualified for the final of the 400 meter individual medley with a 4:46.04 in the prelims heats. She improved upon her rank in the final, placing third with a time of 4:39.50. For the morning prelims heats of the 400 meter freestyle on day four, her fourth event at the Trials, she ranked fourth with a time of 4:10.03 and advanced to the evening final. She swam the race over two seconds faster in the final, placing fifth with a 4:07.97.

2022 Swimming World Cup
For the 2022 FINA Swimming World Cup held in Berlin, Germany, the first stop in three for the circuit, Flickinger won a gold medal in the 400 meter individual medley with a 4:30.36 and a bronze medal in the 200 meter butterfly with a 2:05.63, as well as placing fourth in the 400 meter freestyle with a 4:03.01. Five days after the end of the first stop, the second stop began in Toronto, Canada, and she achieved a fourth-place finish in the 400 meter freestyle in 4:01.21 and approximately 35 minutes later won a silver medal in the 200 meter butterfly with a 2:04.00. In the 400 meter individual medley the next day, she placed fourth, behind three Canadians, with a time of 4:30.90.

The first day of the third and final stop, held in Indianapolis, Flickinger placed sixth in the final of the 400 meter freestyle on day one with a time of 4:02.51, which helped Americans achieve all of the top seven out of eight places. In the same session, she placed fourth in the 200 meter butterfly with a time of 2:05.50, finishing behind one Canadian (gold medalist) and two Americans (silver and bronze medalists). The following day, she placed sixth in the 400 meter individual medley with a 4:36.18, which was 4.88 seconds behind bronze medalist Bailey Andison of Canada. Based on her results for the whole 2022 World Cup, she ranked as the tenth highest-scoring overall female competitor, and the second highest-scoring female American competitor, only behind Beata Nelson.

2022 World Short Course Championships
For the 2022 World Short Course Championships in December in Melbourne, Australia, Flickinger was named to the Team USA roster in the 200 meter butterfly and the 400 meter individual medley.

International championships (50 m)

 Flickinger swam only in the prelims heats.

International championships (25 m)

Personal best times

Long course meters (50 m pool)

Short course meters (25 m pool)

Swimming World Cup circuits
The following medals Flickinger has won at Swimming World Cup circuits.

National records

Long course meters (50 m pool)

Awards and honors
 SwimSwam Top 100 (Women's): 2021 (#25), 2022 (#14)

Personal life
Flickinger is married to fellow Georgia Bulldog swimmer Martin Grodzki, who proposed to her after her performances at the 2016 NCAA Division I Women's Swimming and Diving Championships in Atlanta. She and her husband were married by their swim coach Jack Bauerle before she competed at the 2019 World Aquatics Championships, which was held in July 2019.

The first sponsor Flickinger signed as part of her professional swimming career was swimming goods company Speedo in 2017.

One of Flickinger's hobbies outside the pool is using a stroller to walk her pet cat.

References

External links
 
 
 
 
 
 

1994 births
Living people
American female butterfly swimmers
American female freestyle swimmers
American female medley swimmers
Swimmers from Pennsylvania
Sportspeople from York, Pennsylvania
Georgia Bulldogs women's swimmers
Medalists at the 2015 Summer Universiade
Medalists at the 2020 Summer Olympics
Olympic bronze medalists for the United States in swimming
Olympic swimmers of the United States
Swimmers at the 2016 Summer Olympics
Swimmers at the 2020 Summer Olympics
Universiade bronze medalists for the United States
Universiade gold medalists for the United States
Universiade medalists in swimming
World Aquatics Championships medalists in swimming
Medalists at the FINA World Swimming Championships (25 m)
21st-century American women